The Taiwanese Ambassador to Marshall Islands is the official representative of the Republic of China  to the Republic of the Marshall Islands.

History
Before 1998, there was a representative from the People's Republic of China to the Republic of the Marshall Islands.

List of representatives

References 

China
Marshall Islands